Trophonella echinolamellata is a species of sea snail, a marine gastropod mollusk in the family Muricidae, the murex snails or rock snails.

Description

Distribution
This species occurs in Antarctic waters.

References

 Harasewych, M.G. & Pastorino, G. 2010. Trophonella (Gastropoda: Muricidae), a New Genus from Antarctic Waters, with the Description of a New Species. The Veliger 51(1): 85–103
 Engl W. (2012) Shells of Antarctica. Hackenheim: Conchbooks. 402 pp.

External links

Gastropods described in 1951
Trophonella